The Holy Empire of Reunion (Portuguese: Sacro Império de Reunião) is a micronation that was founded 28 August 1997 as a political and constitutional simulation.

History 
It claims the territory of the French marine department of Réunion Island.  Its creators were students of the Law School of the Pontifical Catholic University of Rio de Janeiro.

The micronation has been mentioned in media.

See also 
List of micronations

References

Further reading
Articles Online – Reunion's library of scanned newspaper and magazine articles published around the world, which refer to the nation.

External links 
Sacro Império de Reunião
Symbols of the Holy Empire of Reunion
Laws and Ordinances of the Holy Empire of Reunion

Micronations
States and territories established in 1997